The Toshiba Pasopia 5 is a computer from manufacturer Toshiba, released in 1984 and based around a Z80 microprocessor. Also known as PA7005, it was released only in Japan, intended as a low price version of the original Toshiba Pasopia.

The keyboard has 90 keys, a separate numeric keypad and eight function keys. The machine could be expanded with disk drives, extra RAM and offered a RS-232 interface and a parallel printer port.
The machine is compatible with the original Pasopia.

See also 
 Toshiba Pasopia IQ
 Toshiba Pasopia
 Toshiba Pasopia 7
 Toshiba Pasopia 16

References 

Pasopia
Z80-based home computers
Computer-related introductions in 1981